David "Shuffle" Steele (born 8 September 1960) is an English musician who was a member of the Beat and Fine Young Cannibals.

Career
He was born in Cowes, Isle of Wight.

From 1978 to 1983, Steele was bassist in the 2 Tone ska revival band the Beat, (known in the United States as the English Beat). After Ranking Roger and Dave Wakeling left the Beat to form General Public, Steele and guitarist Andy Cox recruited singer Roland Gift to form Fine Young Cannibals, whose career lasted into the early 1990s. In 1988, while FYC were on hiatus, Cox and Steele released the instrumental house music single, "Tired of Getting Pushed Around", under the name of Two Men, a Drum Machine and a Trumpet. It reached No. 18 on the UK Singles Chart. That same year, they also collaborated with Wee Papa Girl Rappers on the single "Heat It Up" which reached No. 21. 

Steele's bass lines in the Beat took the Jamaican style of ska and added a harder, punk rock-influenced style. The Beat song, "Mirror in the Bathroom", is largely built on top of the driving, eighth-note bass line that runs through the entire song. Fine Young Cannibals had a more soulful, and sometimes electronic sound, and Steele's bass lines were less prominent in the outfit.

Steele has co-written songs for both the Beat and Fine Young Cannibals, most notably "She Drives Me Crazy", "Good Thing" and "I'm Not the Man I Used to Be".

After the end of his work with Fine Young Cannibals, Steele went on to play a variety of other roles in the music industry. He co-produced two tracks on Gabrielle's album Find Your Way, which reached No. 8 on the UK Albums Chart in 1993,  as well as the soundtrack to the film The Truth About Cats & Dogs in 1996. He has appeared on more than two dozen other albums, most commonly as a backing vocalist, but also as a guitarist, drummer and mixer.

In summer 2004, he released the album Fried, on which he collaborated with the New Orleans vocalist, Jonte Short. The album was a mix of soul, funk and R&B. Fried signed to Sony BMG and their album was re-packaged and re-released with a modified tracklisting and running order, including some 3 new tracks replacing the last 2 of the original tracks, as the album Things Change, released in 2007. 

Steele spent some time living in the French Quarter of New Orleans, but now resides in London.

See also
List of bass guitarists

References

External links 
 
 

1960 births
Living people
English record producers
English session musicians
English songwriters
20th-century English bass guitarists
English rock bass guitarists
Male bass guitarists
The Beat (British band) members
Fine Young Cannibals members
People from Cowes
Musicians from the Isle of Wight
English ska bass guitarists
English new wave musicians